This page lists nationwide public opinion polls that have been conducted relating to the 2003 presidential elections in the Czech Republic.

Lawmakers poll
SC&C made in February 2002 a poll among lawmakers to find out who has the highest chance to be elected. Václav Klaus (ODS) had support of 90% Civic Democratic Party lawmakers and 20% of Social democratic lawmakers. He was acceptable for 29% of Social democrats, 14% of Communists and 17% of Four-Coalition lawmakers. Petr Pithart (KDU-ČSL) polled second. He was supported by 67% of Four-Coalition lawmakers. He was acceptable for 50% of Social democrats, 20% of Communists and 12% of Civic Democrats. Miloš Zeman (ČSSD) had strong support in Czech Social Democratic Party and was acceptable for a large part of Civic Democrats and Communists. Independent candidates such as Václav Fischer had no chance according to the poll.

Voting preference

Polls conducted in 2003

Polls conducted in 2002

Polls conducted in 2001

Polls conducted in 2000

Media Surveys

Acceptability of candidates

Direct or indirect election preference

References

Opinion polling for presidential elections in the Czech Republic
2003 Czech presidential election